Kate E. Creevy is a small animal internist and a professor at Texas A&M College of Veterinary Medicine. She studies the genetic and environmental determinants of healthy aging in companion dogs.

References

External links

Living people
American veterinarians
Texas A&M University faculty
Women veterinarians
Place of birth missing (living people)
Year of birth missing (living people)
Veterinary scientists
Women veterinary scientists